Jennifer Carpenter (born December 7, 1979) is an American actress who is known for her role as Debra Morgan in the Showtime series Dexter, for which she earned a Saturn Award in 2009, and also for playing Rebecca Harris in the CBS television series Limitless.

In 2019, she played Erica Shepherd, the lead role in the NBC drama The Enemy Within. In 2020, Carpenter voiced Sonya Blade in the direct-to-video martial arts film Mortal Kombat Legends: Scorpion's Revenge (2020), a role she reprised in the sequel Mortal Kombat Legends: Battle of the Realms (2021).

Early life
Carpenter was born in Louisville, Kentucky, the daughter of Catherine (née Mitchell) and Robert Carpenter. She attended St. Raphael the Archangel and then Sacred Heart Academy. She trained at the Walden Theatre Conservatory program, and later at New York City's Juilliard School (Drama Division Group 31: 1998–2002).

Before graduation, she was cast in the 2002 Broadway revival of Arthur Miller's The Crucible starring Liam Neeson and Laura Linney.

Career

Carpenter first attracted critical attention for her performance in The Exorcism of Emily Rose. She took home the 2006 MTV Movie Award for "Best Frightened Performance", and received a "Hollywood Life Breakthrough Award". She was named "Breakout Performer" at the 2006 Scream Awards.

In 2008, she starred in Quarantine, an American remake of the 2007 Spanish horror film [REC], about a deadly zombie virus outbreak in an apartment complex.

Carpenter played the role of Debra Morgan in the Showtime crime drama television series Dexter, which premiered October 1, 2006. Her portrayal of the title character's adoptive sister impressed a number of critics, with Australian journalist Jack Marx describing her portrayal of "cool and clumsy" Debra as "so perfect that many viewers appear to have mistaken the character's flaws for the actor's."

In 2011, she starred in the off-Broadway play Gruesome Playground Injuries at Second Stage Theatre and had a guest appearance on the CBS drama The Good Wife.

In January 2014, it was announced that Carpenter would star in a new ABC drama Sea of Fire, playing FBI Agent Leah Pierce. However, the show was not picked up as a series. In August 2014, it was announced that she would provide the voice of Juli Kidman in the survival horror video game The Evil Within, marking her first video game appearance. The game was released in October 2014, and Carpenter provided voicework for two of The Evil Within'''s DLC chapters, "The Assignment" and "The Consequence", which featured Juli Kidman as the playable protagonist. However, Carpenter did not reprise the role in the game's sequel, The Evil Within 2, and her character was recast.

In early 2015, Carpenter was cast in the CBS drama series Limitless in which she co-starred with Jake McDorman.

On July 13, 2021, Showtime confirmed that Carpenter would reprise her role of Debra Morgan in a 10-episode limited series, with Clyde Phillips returning as showrunner. The series premiered on November 7, 2021.

Personal life
In 2007, she began dating her Dexter co-star Michael C. Hall. They eloped on New Year's Eve 2008 in California and publicly appeared together for the first time as a married couple at the 66th Golden Globe Awards in January 2009. In December 2010, Hall and Carpenter released a statement announcing that they had filed for divorce, citing irreconcilable differences, after having been separated "for some time". The divorce was finalized in December 2011; the two remain very close friends.

On February 10, 2015, it was announced that Carpenter and musician Seth Avett were engaged and expecting their first child. In August 2015, it was revealed that Carpenter had given birth in May to a son and admitted that she was eight-and-a-half months pregnant when shooting the pilot episode of Limitless''. Carpenter and Avett married in May 2016.

Filmography

Film

Television

Video games

References

External links

 
 

1979 births
Living people
Actresses from Louisville, Kentucky
American film actresses
American stage actresses
American television actresses
American voice actresses
Juilliard School alumni
20th-century American actresses
21st-century American actresses